Erwin Eichelberger was an Austrian luger who competed in the 1970s. A natural track luger, he won three medals at the FIL European Luge Natural Track Championships with a silver (Singles: 1974) and two bronzes (Singles: 1971, Doubles: 1975).

References

External links
Natural track European Championships results 1970-2006.

Austrian male lugers
Possibly living people
Year of birth missing